Double H Pipeline is a  crude oil pipeline from Dore, North Dakota to Guernsey, Wyoming. It is supposed to carry 100,000 barrels (50,000 initially) of crude oil from the North Dakota Bakken formation shale plays as well as Montana and Wyoming oil fields.

Participates in a joint tariff transportation arrangement with Tallgrass Pony Express Pipeline to transport oil from Seiler Station at Baker, MT to delivery points at the Phillips 66 Refinery at Ponca City, OK and Deeprock Terminal at Cushing Oklahoma.

Double H Pipeline also delivers to other connecting pipelines at Guernsey, Wyoming.

Overview
The project was proposed by Hiland Crude, LLC  a subsidiary of Hiland Partners that was owned by the Harold Hamm family from Enid, Oklahoma.

The 12-inch line was scheduled to begin operating after completion in January 2015. It would connect to the Pony Express Pipeline owned by Tallgrass Energy to connect with the crude oil hub of Cushing, Oklahoma and access lucrative oil markets.

In January 2015, it was reported that Hamm was selling the Bakken pipeline network to Kinder Morgan Inc.

See also
 Tallgrass Energy Partners
 List of oil pipelines
 List of oil refineries

References

Further reading
Hiland Partners Planning New Bakken Oil Pipeline; Potential Capacity Of 100,000 b/d To Guernsey, WY, April 8, 2013, by R.T. Dukes BakkenShale.com

Crude oil pipelines in the United States